Twins of Evil (also known as Twins of Dracula) is a 1971 British horror film directed by John Hough and starring Peter Cushing, with Damien Thomas and the real-life identical twins and former Playboy Playmates Mary and Madeleine Collinson.

It is the third (and final) film in the Karnstein Trilogy, based on the 1872 novella Carmilla by Sheridan Le Fanu. The film has the least resemblance to the novella and adds a witchfinding theme to the vampire story. Much of the interest of the film revolves around the contrasting evil and good natures of two beautiful sisters, Frieda and Maria. Unlike the previous two entries in the series, this film contains only a brief lesbian element.

The film was released in the U.S. as a double feature with Hands of the Ripper.

Plot
Set during the 17th century in Styria, identical twin sisters Maria and Frieda Gelhorn move from Venice to Karnstein in Central Europe to live with their uncle Gustav Weil after becoming recently orphaned. Weil is a stern Puritan and leader of the fanatical witch-hunting 'Brotherhood'. Both twins resent their uncle's sternness and one of them, Frieda, looks for a way to escape. Resenting her uncle, she becomes fascinated by the local Count Karnstein, who has the reputation of being "a wicked man".

Count Karnstein, who enjoys the Emperor's favour and thus remains untouched by the Brotherhood, is indeed wicked and interested in Satanism and black magic. Trying to emulate his evil ancestors, he murders a girl as a human sacrifice, calling forth the vampiress Countess Mircalla Karnstein from her grave. Mircalla turns the Count into a vampire.

Frieda, following an invitation from the Count, steals away to the castle at night, while Maria covers for her absence. In the castle, the Count transforms Frieda into a vampire, offering her a beautiful young chained victim. Returning home, Frieda threatens Maria to keep covering for her nightly excursions, but secretly fearing she might bite her sister.

Meanwhile, Maria becomes interested in the handsome young teacher, Anton, who is initially infatuated with the more mysterious Frieda. Anton has studied what he calls "superstition", but becomes convinced of the existence of vampires when his sister falls victim to one. One night, when Frieda attacks a member of the Brotherhood, she is captured by her uncle and put in jail. While the Brotherhood debates the vampire woman's fate, the Count and his servants kidnap Maria and exchange her for Frieda in the jail cell. Anton goes to see Maria, not knowing that she is actually Frieda. She tries to seduce him, but he sees her lack of reflection in a mirror and repels her with a cross. Anton rushes to rescue Maria from a burning. Maria kisses a cross, revealing her innocence.

Weil now listens to Anton's advice on hunting vampires, and the two men lead the Brotherhood and the villagers to Castle Karnstein to destroy the Count. The Count and Frieda attempt to flee, but they are surprised by Weil. Weil captures Frieda and decapitates her. The Count captures Maria, but Weil appears with an axe. Weil challenges the Count and is killed. Anton seizes his chance and pierces the Count's heart with a spear. Maria and Anton reunite while Karnstein crumbles to corruption.

Cast

 Peter Cushing as Gustav Weil
 Kathleen Byron as Katy Weil
 Mary Collinson as Maria Gellhorn
 Madeleine Collinson as Frieda Gellhorn
 Damien Thomas as Count Karnstein
 David Warbeck as Anton Hoffer
 Dennis Price as Dietrich
 Katya Wyeth as Countess Mircalla Karnstein
 Roy Stewart as Joachim
 Isobel Black as Ingrid Hoffer
 Harvey Hall as Franz
 Alex Scott as Hermann
 Shelagh Wilcox as lady in coach
 Inigo Jackson as woodman
 Judy Matheson as woodman's daughter
 Kirsten Lindholm as young girl at the stake
 Luan Peters as Gerta
 Peter Thompson as gaoler

Production
Hammer was originally going to make a film called Vampire Virgins; however, producer Harry Fine saw a Playboy spread involving the Collinson twins and decided to make a film focusing on them.

 Ingrid Pitt was again offered the part of Countess Mircalla Karnstein, but refused.
 The same sets were used for Vampire Circus.
 Harvey Hall and Kirsten Lindholm appear in all three films of the trilogy, although in different roles in each one. Peter Cushing also played one of the leads in the first, The Vampire Lovers (a part was written for Cushing in the second film, but he dropped out of the production due to the illness of his wife. The role was taken over by Ralph Bates). Luan Peters, who plays a small role in this film, also appeared in the second film, Lust for a Vampire, as did Judy Matheson.
 The original film included a short scene, later cut, in which the evil twin approaches her uncle. The scene is out of place as their uncle is busy burning the other sister; somehow he teleports back home and the evil twin gives him a show. Cut out for American audiences and possibly to maintain continuity, the original scene was aired on public television in the 1980s.
 Music for the film was devised by the British composer Harry Robinson, who had already produced a soundtrack for The Vampire Lovers.

Reception

Film critic Leonard Maltin gave the film a passing grade of two and a half stars, calling it "engaging" and "inspired" in its use of the Collinson twins. A.H. Weiler wrote in The New York Times that the Collinson twins made the film interesting, but "The rest of the costumed crew...hardly give Twins of Evil a good name."

One year after its release, Robert L. Jerome observed, "The film is done with Hammer's obvious care for details and a sobriety which creates the proper mood of unexpected evil in attractive, tranquil surroundings."

In other media
A novelisation of the film was written by Shaun Hutson and published by Arrow Publishing in association with Hammer and the Random House Group in 2011, . The book contains an introduction by the film's director, John Hough.

The film was adapted into an 18-page comic strip for the January–February 1977 issue of the magazine House of Hammer (vol. 1) #7, published by General Book Distribution. It was drawn by Blas Gallego from a script by Chris Lowder. The cover of the issue featured a painting by Brian Lewis based on imagery from the film.

Australian indie rock band Turnstyle used a sample of Karnstein summoning Satan in their song Winter Rodeo, in 1999.

See also
Vampire films

References

External links

1971 films
1971 horror films
1970s erotic films
1971 LGBT-related films
British erotic films
Films about dysfunctional families
Films about murderers
Films about twin sisters
Films based on horror novels
Films based on Irish novels
Films based on works by Sheridan Le Fanu
Films directed by John Hough
Films set in Austria
Films shot at Pinewood Studios
Films shot in Serbia
Films set in castles
Gothic horror films
Hammer Film Productions horror films
Lesbian-related films
LGBT-related horror films
Universal Pictures films
British vampire films
Twins in fiction
1970s English-language films
1970s British films